FoodCo Nigeria is a leading Nigeria-based omnichannel retailer. The company is one of the pioneers of modern retail in the country and owns the largest supermarket chain brand in southwest Nigeria, outside Lagos, with 18 stores spread across the region.

FoodCo pioneered the co-location retail model with built-in supermarkets, restaurants, and entertainment centres, where customers can shop, play and eat in one location. [3] In 2020, it added an online supermarket to its portfolio. 

It also launched FoodCo Quick Shops, a chain of neighbourhood convenience shops offering basic groceries and household items in 2020.

In 2022, FoodCo was listed in the inaugural Financial Times Annual Africa Fastest Growing Companies’ ranking, becoming the only company operating within Nigeria’s organized retail sector to make the list.

History

FoodCo originally started as a fresh fruit and vegetable store in 1981, but expanded into a supermarket a year later. The first FoodCo Supermarket was opened in Bodija, Ibadan. Subsequently, the business grew to include quick-service restaurants, manufacturing and entertainment. The business has now grown from that single branch to several branches with over 700 staff. The first Lagos outlet was opened in 2019. Just in 2020, her son Ade Sun-Basorun stepped in as Chief Executive Officer of FoodCo Nigeria Limited, while she assumed the position of Chairman.

FoodCo Supermarkets

FoodCo Supermarkets is the biggest supermarket chain in southwest Nigeria, outside Lagos. It is also the oldest among the top 10 supermarket chains in Nigeria.

FoodCo Supermarkets operate an online service that offers a full stock range similar to the physical stores. The supermarkets are complemented by a home delivery service launched in 2020.

FoodCo Restaurants

FoodCo is a Quick Service Restaurant (QSR) in Nigeria. It started as a popular hangout where people could get pastries such as doughnuts, meat pies and chicken pies in the 80s and 90s in Ibadan. Over the years, the business evolved into quick-service restaurants.

Currently, FoodCo restaurants are a key feature of the brand’s outlets.

FoodCo Entertainment Centre

FoodCo Entertainment Centre offers gaming, indoor and recreational sports facilities. In 2019, the Entertainment Centre hosted the inaugural FoodCo Football Videogame Championship, with over 240 contestants participating in the competition.

FoodCo Fellowship Programme 

FoodCo Fellowship Program (FFP) is a specialized capacity-building program aimed at building the next generation of business leaders to drive growth in the Nigerian consumer retail sector. The programme offers a 2-year immersive training in business management and leadership to MBA and post-graduate students looking to pursue a career in retail.

FoodCo Products 

FoodCo's manufacturing department produces a range of products under the SunFresh brand. In 2019, the company introduced its Sunfresh range of ice creams into the market.

In 2021, it expanded its product portfolio with the launch of SunFresh premium table water. In 2022, FoodCo's SunFresh Premium Bread was recognized as Africa’s Most Outstanding Quality Bread Brand by the African Quality Congress.

Awards

Africa's Second Fastest Growing Retail Company, 2022 FT Annual Africa Fastest Growing Companies.

Retailer of the year, 2020 Marketing Edge Brands and Advertising Excellence Awards

Retail Company of the Year, 2020 BusinessDay Nigerian Business Leaders Awards

Multigenerational Company of the Year, 2019 BusinessDay Nigerian Business Leadership Awards (Excellence in Enterprise).

Best Bread in Africa, 2019 African Brand Congress.

References

External links
 Official website

Nigerian companies established in 1982
Food and drink companies of Nigeria
Supermarkets of Nigeria
Companies based in Ibadan
Online retailers of Nigeria
Retail companies established in 1982
Retail companies of Nigeria
Nigerian brands
Online grocers